Vladimir Vasilyevich Ilyin (15 January 1928, in Kolomna – 17 July 2009, in Moscow) was a Soviet professional football player.

He was the first coach of Andrey Kobelev.

Honours
 Soviet Top League champion: 1949, 1954, 1955, 1957.
 Soviet Top League runner-up: 1946, 1947, 1950, 1956.
 Soviet Top League bronze: 1952.
 Soviet Top League top scorer: 1954 (11 goals).
 Soviet Cup winner: 1953.
 Soviet Cup finalist: 1949, 1950.

External links
 Career summary by KLISF
 Profile at fc-dynamo.ru

References

1928 births
2009 deaths
People from Kolomna
Soviet footballers
Russian footballers
FC Lokomotyv Kharkiv players
FC Dynamo Moscow players
FC Dynamo Kirov players
Soviet Top League players
Association football forwards
Sportspeople from Moscow Oblast